Čakljanac is a river island located on the Danube in Serbia, south of Forkontumac and the city of Pančevo.

River islands of Serbia
Islands of the Danube